Fightingtown Creek is a stream in the U.S. state of Georgia. It is a tributary to the Ocoee River.

Fightingtown is accurate preservation of its native Cherokee name, for near the site met warring tribal leaders.

References

Rivers of Georgia (U.S. state)
Rivers of Fannin County, Georgia
Rivers of Gilmer County, Georgia
Rivers of Polk County, Georgia